Kim Ji-soo (born Yang Sung-yoon on October 24, 1972) is a South Korean actress.

Career 
A graduate of Kaywon High School of the Arts, Kim made her acting debut in 1992. She worked as a television actress for over a decade before branching out into film, saying in an interview that, "I was getting older by the second, and I hated becoming complacent." In 2005, Kim made her first big screen appearance with a leading role in Lee Yoon-ki's This Charming Girl, a character study of a twenty-something single woman working at a post office. The film was well received by critics, and Kim herself was singled out for praise, with The Japan Times commenting, "Kim's performance is a masterful balance of understatedness and open-wounded vulnerability." Kim won Best Actress at the Singapore International Film Festival, and Best New Actress at the Blue Dragon Film Awards, Busan Film Critics Awards, and Korean Film Awards, with a further nomination at the Grand Bell Awards. Due to the success of This Charming Girl on the international film festival circuit, and in recognition of her role in promoting Korean culture overseas, Kim was invited to a Blue House luncheon, where she met then-South Korean President Roh Moo-hyun and First Lady Kwon Yang-suk.

In 2006 Kim appeared in several films, first with Jo Jae-hyun in the melodrama Romance, though she was publicly critical about the lack of depth to her character. In October 2006, she portrayed a victim of the Sampoong Department Store collapse in Traces of Love, which was selected as the opening film of the 11th Pusan International Film Festival. In November 2006, Kim starred opposite Han Suk-kyu in the romantic drama Solace, receiving a nomination for Best Actress at the Korean Film Awards.

Kim returned to television in May 2008 with a leading role in the drama Women of the Sun. Her turn as a complex antiheroine garnered praise, and she won a Top Excellence Award in Acting at the year-end KBS Drama Awards and a nomination for Best TV Actress at the Baeksang Arts Awards.

In 2010 she starred in her first historical series The King of Legend which focuses on Geunchogo, the 13th ruler of Baekje. Shortly before the drama's premiere, Kim was involved in a drunken hit-and-run accident (this was her second offense; her first DUI was in 2000 for which she lost her license). Starring roles followed in Love Again (2012) and One Warm Word (2013).

When asked in an interview if she would consider appearing nude onscreen, Kim replied, "I don't want to take nude scenes to prove my passion for acting, which I have always had."

In November 2020, Kim signed with new agency Lead Entertainment.

In November 2022, Kim left Lead Entertainment and signed with new agency IOK Company.

Personal life 
She was in a six-year relationship with actor Kim Joo-hyuk, with whom she co-starred in the 2002 SBS drama series Like a Flowing River. The couple broke up in 2009.

After her change in relationship status on Facebook was leaked in March 2012, Kim confirmed that she was dating  a Korean-Canadian 16 years her junior. The couple split in 2013.

Filmography

Television series

Film

Variety show

Music video

Awards and nominations

References

External links 
  
 
 
 

1972 births
Living people
People from Gangwon Province, South Korea
20th-century South Korean actresses
21st-century South Korean actresses
South Korean film actresses
South Korean television actresses
MAMA Award winners